Waterboro is a hamlet in Chautauqua County, New York, United States at an elevation of 1293 ft (394 m) above sea level.  Located in the northeast corner of the Town of Poland, it is now a closed railroad depot. The depot is supposed to connect the Western New York & Pennsylvania with the New York & Lake Erie, but switches and rails required for the junction to operate properly are not in usable condition and will need to be replaced; the NY&LE expected the junction to be fixed and operational by 2019 (a date that has come and gone with no developments), whereas the WNY&P's supervising authority has no plans to restore the junction (but does have plans to replace existing, worn-out rails and ties in the Waterboro area, which may or may not include preparing for a reconnection with the NYLE). The city of Jamestown announced its support for restoring service to Waterboro and have commissioned, along with the state of New York, a feasibility study for the project. Cattaraugus County has refused to take part in the study, believing the project is not feasible. As of June 2018, no progress had been made toward the reconnection of the two railroads.

References

Hamlets in New York (state)
Hamlets in Chautauqua County, New York